was a screw sloop, originally built in the United Kingdom for Chōshū Domain in western Japan, and subsequently served in the early Imperial Japanese Navy.

History
Hōshō was built in 1868 in Aberdeen, Scotland as a wooden-hulled three-masted bark-rigged sloop-of-war with a coal-fired triple expansion reciprocating steam engine with two boilers driving a single screw. She arrived in Japan in 1869, and was named  by Chōshū Domain authorities. She served during the Boshin War of the Meiji Restoration, and was famous for allowing 330 Satsuma rōnin agitators to escape from Shinagawa, Edo in January 1868, despite efforts by the Tokugawa shogunate to prevent their escape. She was transferred to the fledgling Imperial Japanese Navy on May 15, 1871.

On June 8, 1871, the Meiji government renamed the vessel  Hōshō . The ship was sent to support government operations during the Saga Rebellion in 1874, and was one of the ships in the Japanese fleet during the Taiwan Expedition of 1874. In 1877,  Hōshō  provided support to government forces during the Satsuma Rebellion.

On August 16, 1881,  Hōshō  was removed from frontline combat duty and was reassigned as a training vessel. During the First Sino-Japanese War, she was assigned to be a guard vessel, initially at Kure Naval Base, but later at Sasebo Naval Base. She was re-designated as a second-class gunboat on March 21, 1898, and was used for coastal patrol duties; however, she was declared obsolete and removed from service on Mar 1, 1898. It was struck from the navy list on April 19, 1906. It was scrapped on April 8, 1907.

References

Screw sloops of the Imperial Japanese Navy
1877 ships
First Sino-Japanese War naval ships of Japan
Three-masted ships
Ships built in Aberdeen